Oleksandr Zynoviiovych Bondurianskyi (born 1945) is a Ukrainian pianist and 1994 recipient of the People's Artist of Russia. who was born in Kherson, Ukraine and used to take music lessons from Alexander Sokovnin at the Chișinău Music State Conservatory. Later on, he moved to Moscow where he studied piano and chamber music at the Moscow Conservatory under guidance from both Dimitri Bashkirov and Tatiana Gaidamovich. Soon after, he became a member of Moscow Piano Trio and began traveling in Russia and in the rest of the world. He used to be a teacher of both Chișinău and Moscow Conservatories at the later of which he became a professor. Since 1995, as many as 250 students have graduated under his guidance, which later became well known chamber music teachers throughout Russia.

References

1945 births
Living people
Ukrainian pianists
Musicians from Kherson
People's Artists of Russia
21st-century pianists